Henlow Stadium is a greyhound track located at Stondon, in the English county of Bedfordshire, slightly to the north of Hitchin. The stadium has a restaurant, a number of bars and a bistro.

Racing takes place every Monday and Thursday morning, Tuesday evening and Saturday and Sunday afternoon.

History

20th Century
During the boom time of greyhound racing in 1927 Henlow was one of many tracks appearing around Britain, the site at Henlow Camp was previously a straights track starting in 1923. 
Racing got underway on 1 August 1927 but the track was to remain independent (unlicensed) for nearly fifty years. The stadium located on the Bedford Road, Lower Stondon in an area known as Henlow Camp named after the First World War RAF Henlow but now a civilian settlement. In the early days of racing the hare was a drag lure driven by a lorry wheel and racing was watched from the Ickleford side of the track. There were issues in the early thirties when due to the popularity of Sunday racing the crowds unintentionally but continually blocked the main road when frequenting the track. In 1935 the track licence changed hands from H.E Day to A.A Furr.

Henlow remained a popular flapping track and had a capacity of just 1,000 spectators after the Second World War following a switch of viewing facilities to the other side of the track still used today. In the late fifties the Smith family took over the running of the track and in the late sixties racing was held on Monday and Friday evenings at 7.45pm over distances of 350, 530 and 880 yards. The circumference was 470 yards and the principal event was the Henlow Derby. There was an inside Sumner hare on an all sand track with seven bookmakers on site. Totalisator and photo finish had also been installed.

In 1974 Come on Wonder (full litter brother to Dolores Rocket) broke track records at West Ham Stadium and Crayford & Bexleyheath Stadium before being disqualified and going on to race on the independent circuits winning the Henlow Derby. It was not until 1976 that the opportunity arose to race under the National Greyhound Racing Club permit rules, SW Smith was the General Manager and Dave Smith was the Racing Manager. Track changes resulted in the circumference being made considerably smaller, the 412 circumference hosted distances of 318, 484, 730 and 890 metres, the third and fourth bends retained a rather odd shape in the process.

In 1992 Patsy Cusack steered Pennys Best to the 1992 English Greyhound Derby final. and in January 1994 Jock McNaughton a Strathclyde man bought the track from the Smith family, McNaughton had previously been a permit trainer at Rye House Stadium and Henlow and as a boy had raced at Blantyre. The track changed again when Tony McDonnell bought the lease under the name of Henlow Racing Ltd and undertook several refurbishment projects. McDonnell would be General Manager and he bring in an ex-trainer Keith Mellor as the Racing Manager. McDonnell continued to run the track but changes were made on the management front, Keith Woolsey became General Manager and Paul Mellor (son of Keith) Racing Manager.

21st Century
In 2006 a new restaurant was constructed in the stadium, at a cost of £464,000. Henlow Stadium won the 2007 English Greyhound Derby trophy with Westmead Lord trained from the Nick Savva kennel and owned by the Morton family.

Businessman Bob Morton (known for owning Westmead Hawk) purchased the track from Tony McDonnell in 2008 along with Kevin Boothby who took a half share. Morton and Boothby had saved the track from potential development but Morton moved back to the Channel Islands in 2012 leaving Kevin Boothby in sole control.

Rio Quattro won the richest ever prize in greyhound racing in 2015 when the Daniel Riordan Henlow trained black dog picked up the £250,000 winner's purse for winning the 2015 English Greyhound Derby.

In 2018 the stadium signed a deal with SIS to race every Monday morning, Tuesday evening, Thursday morning and Sunday afternoon. Leading trainer Mark Wallis joined the track during August 2018.

In 2020 local planners agreed to plans for the site being developed. The lease held by Kevin Boothby was due to end in November 2021 but he was seeking a five-year extension. Boothy had already branched out by gaining a 10-year lease at Towcester Greyhound Stadium.

Competitions
 Henlow Derby

Track records

Current

Former track records

References

External links
 Official site

Greyhound racing venues in the United Kingdom
Sports venues in Bedfordshire